Joseph Watts (born 1942) also known as "The German" is an associate of the Gambino crime family. He was a close confidant of former boss John Gotti and participated in the infamous 1985 assassination of Paul "Big Paul" Castellano. Watts was not a made man due to being only Italian on his maternal side, while being German, Welsh on his paternal side.

After underboss Tommy Bilotti was murdered, Watts was given Bilotti's black book for his loansharking operation, which made him a millionaire and a good earner for the Gambino family. Watts also insisted that Gotti should put a hit on his brother, Joey Bilotti as well. However, Bilotti accepted the fate of his brother and did not retaliate, therefore killing him was unnecessary.

John Gotti appointed Watts as a liaison to the Westies, an Irish-American gang in Hells Kitchen. The Westies were being used as hired guns for the Gambino family under Paul Castellano, and continued under the Gotti regime.

Watts was charged and acquitted of the 1987 killing of William Ciccone. According to the testimony of government witness; Dominic "Fat Dom" Borghese, Watts allegedly drove him from Queens to Staten Island in the back of his black Mercedes-Benz. Borghese testified that Watts shot Ciccone in the head five times.

In 2011, Watts was convicted for his part in a 1989 murder conspiracy ordered by John Gotti, and sentenced to 13 years in prison. He served his sentence at FCI Cumberland, and was released from prison on January 14, 2022.

References

1942 births
Gambino crime family
Date of birth unknown
American people convicted of murder
American people of Welsh descent
American gangsters of Italian descent
Living people
American people of German descent
People acquitted of murder
Criminals from Staten Island
Gangsters from New York City